The Great Gatsby is a 2013 historical romantic drama film based on the 1925 novel of the same name by F. Scott Fitzgerald. The film was co-written and directed by Baz Luhrmann and stars an ensemble cast consisting of Leonardo DiCaprio, Tobey Maguire, Carey Mulligan, Joel Edgerton, Isla Fisher, Jason Clarke, and Elizabeth Debicki. Jay-Z served as executive producer. Filming took place from September to December 2011 in Australia, with a $105 million net production budget. The film follows the life and times of millionaire Jay Gatsby (DiCaprio) and his neighbor Nick Carraway (Maguire), who recounts his encounter with Gatsby at the height of the Roaring Twenties on Long Island in New York.

A polarizing film among critics, The Great Gatsby received both praise and criticism for its visual style, direction, screenplay, performances, soundtrack, and its interpretation of the source material. Audiences responded more positively, and Fitzgerald's granddaughter praised the film, stating "Scott would have been proud." As of 2023, it is Luhrmann's highest-grossing film, grossing over $353 million worldwide. At the 86th Academy Awards, the film won in both of its nominated categories: Best Production Design and Best Costume Design.

Plot
In December 1929, World War I veteran Nick Carraway, undergoing treatment at a psychiatric hospital, tells his doctor about Jay Gatsby, the most hopeful man he ever met. The doctor suggests Nick tap into his passion and write down his thoughts, and Nick begins cataloging the events to his doctor.

Seven years earlier, in the summer of 1922, Nick moved from the Midwest to New York after abandoning writing. He rents a small groundskeeper's cottage in the North Shore village of West Egg, next to the mansion of Gatsby, a mysterious business magnate who often hosts extravagant parties. Nick has dinner with his beautiful cousin Daisy Buchanan and her domineering husband, Tom, at their mansion in East Egg. Daisy plays matchmaker between Nick and another guest, Jordan Baker, a famous golfer. When Nick returns home, he sees Gatsby standing by the harbor, reaching toward a green light coming from the Buchanans' dock.

Tom brings Nick to the Valley of Ashes, an industrial dumping site between West Egg and the city, and picks up his mistress Myrtle Wilson at a garage owned by her husband George. One day, Nick receives an invitation to one of Gatsby's parties. There, Nick encounters Jordan and they both meet Gatsby. Gatsby takes Nick to Manhattan for lunch, telling Nick on the way that he is an Oxford graduate and war hero from a wealthy Midwestern family. They go to a speakeasy, where Gatsby introduces Nick to his business partner Meyer Wolfsheim.

Jordan tells Nick how Gatsby, a Captain of the U.S. Army, started a relationship with Daisy in 1917 before the U.S. entered World War I, and is still in love with her; he throws parties hoping that Daisy might attend. Gatsby asks Nick to invite Daisy to tea. After an awkward reunion, Gatsby and Daisy begin an affair. Gatsby is dismayed when Daisy wants to run away with him, preferring that she get a proper divorce. He asks Nick and Jordan to accompany him to the Buchanan home, where he and Daisy plan to tell Tom that Daisy is leaving him. During the luncheon, Tom becomes suspicious of Gatsby and Daisy, but Daisy stops Gatsby from revealing anything to Tom and suggests they all go to the Plaza Hotel. Tom drives Nick and Jordan in Gatsby's car while Gatsby drives Daisy in Tom's car. Tom stops for gas at George's garage, where George tells him that he and Myrtle are moving and that he suspects Myrtle is unfaithful.

At the Plaza, Gatsby tells Tom of his affair with Daisy. Tom accuses Gatsby of having never attended Oxford and having made his fortune through bootlegging with mobsters. Eventually, both Gatsby and Daisy leave. After fighting with George over her infidelity, Myrtle runs into the street and is fatally struck by Gatsby's car after mistaking it for Tom's. Upon learning about Myrtle's death, Tom tells George that the car belongs to Gatsby and that he suspects Gatsby was Myrtle's lover, while Nick deduces Daisy was driving when the accident happened. Nick, overhearing Daisy accepting Tom's promise to take care of everything, tries to warn Gatsby about it, but the latter stubbornly believed that Daisy decided to live with Gatsby.

Inside the mansion, Gatsby tells Nick the truth that he was born penniless; his real name is James Gatz, and he had asked Daisy to wait for him until he had made something of himself after the war; instead, she married Tom seven months after the war ended. The next day, Nick goes back to work and Gatsby awaits a call from Daisy while swimming in his pool. The phone rings, and a servant answers it. Believing the caller to be Daisy, Gatsby is shot and killed by a vengeful George, who then commits suicide. Nick, who was the one calling, hears the gunshots and is the only person other than reporters to attend Gatsby's funeral as Daisy, Tom, and their daughter are leaving New York. The media falsely and negatively paints Gatsby as Myrtle's lover and killer, infuriating Nick. Disgusted with both the city and its inhabitants, Nick leaves after taking a final walk through Gatsby's deserted mansion and reflecting on Gatsby's ability to hope.

In the sanatorium, Nick finishes typing his memoir and titles it The Great Gatsby.

Cast

 Leonardo DiCaprio as James Gatz / Jay Gatsby, a mysterious millionaire who hosts wild parties at his house with the hope that his former lover Daisy will return
 Tasman Palazzi as young James Gatz
 Callan McAuliffe as teen James Gatz
 Tobey Maguire as Nick Carraway, a would-be writer, Gatsby's friend, and the film's narrator
 Carey Mulligan as Daisy Buchanan, Gatsby's former lover, Tom's wife, and Nick's cousin
 Joel Edgerton as Tom Buchanan, an old-money socialite who hates Gatsby because of his new-money status and relationship with Daisy
 Jason Clarke as George Wilson, Myrtle's husband and owner of a gas station in Valley of Ashes
 Isla Fisher as Myrtle Wilson, Tom's mistress and an ambitious social climber
 Elizabeth Debicki as Jordan Baker, a golf star and Daisy's best friend
 Jack Thompson as Dr. Walter Perkins, a doctor at the psychiatric hospital where Nick is a patient
 Amitabh Bachchan as Meyer Wolfsheim, a gambler who met Gatsby in 1919
 Adelaide Clemens as Catherine, Myrtle's sister
 Richard Carter as Herzog, Gatsby's butler
 Steve Bisley as Dan Cody, an alcoholic millionaire yacht owner that Gatsby met in his teenage years

Additionally, Baz Luhrmann makes an uncredited cameo as a waiter.

Production

Development
Prior to this version, there had already been an opera and numerous other dramatic adaptations of F. Scott Fitzgerald's acclaimed 1925 novel of the same name. In December 2008, Variety reported that this film adaptation was to be made with Baz Luhrmann as director.

Luhrmann stated that he planned it to be more up-to-date due to its theme of criticizing the often irresponsible lifestyles of wealthy people. To commit to the project, in September 2010 Luhrmann moved with his family from Australia to Chelsea in Lower Manhattan, where he had intended to film The Great Gatsby. While Luhrmann was at the Consumer Electronics Show in January 2011, he told The Hollywood Reporter that he had been workshopping The Great Gatsby in 3D, though he had not yet decided whether to shoot in the format. In late January 2011, Luhrmann showed doubt about staying on board with the project, before deciding to stay.

In 2010, it was reported that the film was being set up by Sony Pictures Entertainment but by 2011, Warner Bros. was close to acquiring a deal to finance and take worldwide distribution of The Great Gatsby.

Casting

Luhrmann said the results from the movie's workshop process of auditioning actors for roles in The Great Gatsby had been "very encouraging" to him. Leonardo DiCaprio was cast first, in the title role of Jay Gatsby. It is the second time Luhrmann and DiCaprio worked together; DiCaprio costarred in Luhrmann's Romeo + Juliet (1996). Tobey Maguire was cast to play Nick Carraway. It is also the second time that Maguire and DiCaprio have been working together since This Boy's Life. Reports linked Amanda Seyfried to the lead role of Daisy Buchanan, in October 2010. The next month Deadline Hollywood reported that Luhrmann had been auditioning numerous actresses, including Seyfried, Keira Knightley, Jessica Alba, Rebecca Hall, Blake Lively, Abbie Cornish, Michelle Williams and Scarlett Johansson, as well as considering Natalie Portman, for Daisy. Soon afterward, with her commitment to Cameron Crowe's We Bought a Zoo (2011), Johansson pulled out.

On November 15, Luhrmann announced that Carey Mulligan had been cast to play Daisy after reading for the part on November 2 in New York. She got the role shortly after Luhrmann showed her audition footage to Sony Pictures Entertainment executives Amy Pascal and Doug Belgrad, who were impressed by the actress' command of the character. Mulligan burst into tears after learning of her casting via a phone call from Luhrmann, who informed her of his decision while she was on the red carpet at an event in New York. Luhrmann said: "I was privileged to explore the character with some of the world's most talented actresses, each one bringing their own particular interpretation, all of which were legitimate and exciting. However, specific to this particular production of The Great Gatsby, I was thrilled to pick up the phone an hour ago to the young Oscar-nominated British actress Carey Mulligan and say to her: 'Hello, Daisy Buchanan.'"

In April 2011, Ben Affleck was in talks about playing the role of Tom Buchanan but had to pass due to a scheduling conflict with Argo (2012). Bradley Cooper had previously lobbied for the part and Luke Evans was a major contender. In May, Joel Edgerton was confirmed in the part of Tom. Isla Fisher was cast to play Myrtle Wilson. Australian newcomer Elizabeth Debicki won the part of Jordan Baker.

While casting for the supporting role of Jordan, the filmmaker said the character must be "as thoroughly examined as Daisy, for this production, for this time", adding, "It's like Olivier's Hamlet was the right Hamlet for his time. Who would Hamlet be today? Same with a Jordan or a Daisy". In June 2011, Jason Clarke was cast as George B. Wilson. Indian actor Amitabh Bachchan makes a cameo appearance as Meyer Wolfshiem; this was his first Hollywood role.

Screenplay
Breanne L. Healman noted five key changes made in the novel's plot: Nick Carraway is writing from a sanitarium, having checked himself in some time after the summer with Gatsby; he flirts with Jordan Baker but, unlike what happens in the novel, he's "too smitten with Gatsby to notice her"; Gatsby himself makes a grand entrance, whereas in the novel some time passes as they talk before Carraway realizes who he is; some of the racism or anti-Semitism has been toned down or removed; finally, Gatsby dies thinking his pursuit of Daisy was successful.

Filming

The Great Gatsby was planned to be filmed in the New York City area where the novel is set, starting in June 2011. The director instead opted to shoot principal photography in Sydney. Filming began on September 5, 2011, at Fox Studios Australia and finished on December 22, 2011, with additional shots filmed in January 2012. The film was shot with Red Epic digital cameras and Zeiss Ultra Prime lenses. The "Valley of Ashes", the desolate land located between West Egg and New York was shot in Balmain, New South Wales and Manly Business School in Manly–known as Saint Patrick's Seminary–doubled as Gatsby's mansion. Nick's house was located in Centennial Park. Daisy's house was Gowan Brae, a historic mansion at The King's School, Parramatta.

Sets

In creating the background scenery for the world depicted in the film, designer Catherine Martin stated that the team styled the interior sets of Jay Gatsby's mansion with gilded opulence, in a style that blended establishment taste with Art Deco. The long-destroyed Beacon Towers, thought by scholars to have partially inspired Fitzgerald's Jay Gatsby estate, was used as a main inspiration for Gatsby's home in the film. The location used to film the exterior of Jay Gatsby's mansion was the college building of the International College of Management, Sydney, Some inspiration was also drawn from other Gold Coast, Long Island, mansions, including Oheka Castle and La Selva Mansion. Features evoking the Long Island mansions were added in post-production.

The inspiration for the film version of the Buchanan estate came from Old Westbury Gardens. The mansion exterior was built on a soundstage, with digital enhancements added. The interior sets for the Buchanan mansion were inspired by the style of Hollywood Regency.

The home of Nick Carraway was conceived as an intimate cottage, in contrast with the grandeur of the neighboring Gatsby mansion. Objects chosen adhered to a central theme of what the designers saw as classic Long Island. The architecture conjures American Arts and Crafts, with Gustav Stickley-type furnishings inside and an Adirondack-style swing out.

The opening scene was filmed from Rivendell Child, Adolescent and Family Unit in Concord, Sydney, only a few kilometres from Sydney 2000 Olympic Stadium.

Costumes
Many apparel designers were approached in collaboration of the film's costumes. The Great Gatsby achieved the iconic 1920s look by altering pieces from the Prada and Miu Miu fashion archives. Martin also collaborated with Brooks Brothers for the costumes worn by the male cast members and extras. Tiffany & Co. provided the jewelry for the film. Catherine Martin and Miuccia Prada were behind the wardrobe and worked closely together to create pieces with "the European flair that was emerging amongst the aristocratic East Coast crowds in the Twenties".

Costume historians of the period, however, said that the costumes were not authentic, but instead modernized the 1920s-era fashions to look more like modern fashions. Most prominently, the women were clothed to emphasize their breasts, such as Daisy's push-up bra, in contrast to the flat-chested fashions of the era. While the book was set in 1922, the film included fashions from the entire decade of the 1920s and even the 1930s. Many of the fashions from archives were concepts from runways and fashion magazines that were never worn by women in real life. Martin says that she took the styles of the 1920s and made them sexier and was trying to interpret 1920s styles for a modern audience. Alice Jurow, of the Art Deco Society of California, said that she loved the film, but most of their members prefer more period-perfect films. The men's costumes were more authentic, except that the pants were too tight.

Release and marketing
Originally scheduled for a December 25, 2012 release, on August 6, 2012, it was reported that the film was being moved to a summer 2013 release date. In September 2012, this date was confirmed to be May 10, 2013. The film opened the 66th Cannes Film Festival on May 15, 2013, shortly following its wide release in RealD 3D and 2D formats.

Songs featured in various trailers include: "No Church in the Wild" by Jay-Z and Kanye West; a cover of U2's "Love Is Blindness" performed by Jack White; a cover of The Turtles' "Happy Together" by the band Filter; a cover of Amy Winehouse's "Back to Black" performed by André 3000 and Beyoncé; "Young and Beautiful" performed by Lana Del Rey; and two songs, "Bedroom Hymns" and "Over the Love", performed by Florence and the Machine.

On April 15, 2013, Brooks Brothers premiered "The Gatsby Collection", a line of men's clothing, shoes and accessories "inspired by the costumes designed by Catherine Martin for Baz Luhrmann's The Great Gatsby". According to Fashion Weekly, "The looks weren't simply based on 1920s style: the new duds were designed based on the brand's actual archives [...] Brooks Brothers was one of the initial arbiters of Gatsby-era look. The actual costumes, designed by Catherine Martin, will be on display in select Brooks Brothers boutiques."

On April 17, 2013, Tiffany & Co. unveiled windows at its Fifth Avenue flagship store "inspired by" Luhrmann's film and created in collaboration with Luhrmann and costumer Catherine Martin. The jewelry store also premiered "The Great Gatsby Collection" line of jewelry designed in anticipation of the film. The collection comprises 7 pieces: a brooch, a headpiece (both reportedly based on archival Tiffany designs), a necklace and four different rings, including one in platinum with a 5.25-carat diamond, priced at US$875,000.

Soundtrack

Released on May 7, the film's soundtrack is also available in a deluxe edition; a Target exclusive release also features three extra tracks. The film score was executive-produced by Jay-Z and The Bullitts.

Penned by Lana Del Rey and the film's director, Baz Luhrmann, the song "Young and Beautiful" was released to contemporary hit radio as a single, and was used as the film's buzz single. A snippet of the track appeared in the official trailer for the film and played during the scene where the characters portrayed by Leonardo DiCaprio and Carey Mulligan express their romantic feelings for one another. Hip hop magazine Rap-Up called the single "haunting", while MTV called it "somber-sounding". The track performed by Florence and the Machine, "Over the Love", references the "green light" symbol from the novel in its lyrics. Chris Payne of Billboard praised Beyoncé and André 3000's cover of "Back to Black", made unique with a downtempo EDM wobble. The xx recorded "Together" for the film, with Jamie Smith telling MTV that the band's contribution to the soundtrack sounds like "despair", and revealing that it utilizes a 60-piece orchestra.

Speaking of his goals for the movie's musical backdrop, Baz Luhrmann expressed his desire to blend the music of the Jazz Age, associated with the 1922 setting of the story, with a modern spin. Much like his modern twists applied in Moulin Rouge! and Romeo + Juliet, Baz uses the movie's music not as a background, but instead prominently in the foreground, which takes on a character of its own.

Reception

Box office
The Great Gatsby grossed $144.8 million in North America, and $208.8 million in other countries, for a worldwide total of $353.6 million. Calculating in all expenses, Deadline Hollywood estimate that the film made a profit of $58.6 million.

In North America, The Great Gatsby earned US$19.4 million on its opening Friday, including US$3.25 million from Thursday night and midnight shows. It went on to finish in second place, behind Iron Man 3, during its opening weekend, with US$51.1 million. This was the sixth-largest opening weekend for a film that did not debut in first place, the second largest opening weekend for a film starring Leonardo DiCaprio behind Inception, and Luhrmann's highest-grossing movie.

Critical response
On review aggregation website Rotten Tomatoes the film has an approval rating of 48% based on 304 reviews, with an average rating of 5.9/10. The website's critical consensus reads, "While certainly ambitious—and every bit as visually dazzling as one might expect—Baz Luhrmann's The Great Gatsby emphasizes visual splendor at the expense of its source material's vibrant heart." Metacritic gives the film a score of 55 out of 100, based on reviews from 45 critics, indicating "mixed or average reviews". Audiences polled by the market research firm CinemaScore gave an average grade of "B" on an A+ to F scale.

Joe Morgenstern of The Wall Street Journal felt the elaborate production designs were a misfire and likened the film to the Roaring Twenties themselves as Fitzgerald envisioned and criticized them, stating that what is "intractably wrong with the film is that there's no reality to heighten; it's a spectacle in search of a soul". The Chicago Reader review felt "Luhrmann is exactly the wrong person to adapt such a delicately rendered story, and his 3D feature plays like a ghastly Roaring 20s blowout at a sorority house". In The Atlantic, Christopher Orr observed that "The problem is that when the movie is entertaining it's not Gatsby, and when it's Gatsby it's not entertaining."

The positive reviews included A. O. Scott of The New York Times, who felt the adaptation was "a lot of fun" and "less a conventional movie adaptation than a splashy, trashy opera, a wayward, lavishly theatrical celebration of the emotional and material extravagance that Fitzgerald surveyed with fascinated ambivalence"; Scott advised "the best way to enjoy the film is to put aside whatever literary agenda you are tempted to bring with you". Ty Burr of The Boston Globe reserved special praise for DiCaprio's performance, saying "magnificent is the only word to describe this performance – the best movie Gatsby by far, superhuman in his charm and connections, the host of revels beyond imagining, and at his heart an insecure fraud whose hopes are pinned to a woman".

The Scene Magazine gave the movie a "B−" rating, and praised the actors' performances, in particular saying that "the stand-out actor is Joel Edgerton as Tom Buchanan doing an excellent job of showing the character's gruffness, despite the one-dimensionality given to him". A granddaughter of Fitzgerald praised the style and music of the film.

Tobey Maguire's role as Nick was given mixed reviews from critics, with Philip French of The Guardian calling him "miscast or misdirected"; Ann Hornaday of The Washington Post saying "Tobey Maguire is his usual recessive presence, barely registering as either a dynamic part of the events he describes or their watchful witness"; and Elizabeth Weitzman of The New York Daily News saying despite "the wry-observational skills needed for Nick's Midwestern decency", the character is "directed toward a wide-eyed, one-note performance". Rick Groen of The Globe and Mail was more positive of Maguire's character, saying "our narrator, [is] prone to his occasionally purple rhetoric. But that imposed conceit, the image of a talented depressive writing from inside the bauble of his imagination, seems to validate his inflated prose and, better yet, lets us re-appreciate its inherent poetry".

Accolades

See also

Other film adaptations of The Great Gatsby include:
 The Great Gatsby (1926 film), a silent film starring Warner Baxter and Lois Wilson
 The Great Gatsby (1949 film), starring Alan Ladd and Betty Field
 The Great Gatsby (1974 film), starring Robert Redford and Mia Farrow
 The Great Gatsby (2000 film), a TV film starring Toby Stephens and Mira Sorvino, with Paul Rudd as Nick Carraway
 G, a loosely adapted hip hop musical starring Richard T. Jones

References

External links

 
 
 
 
 
 The Great Gatsby: novel and film information

2013 films
2013 3D films
2013 romantic drama films
2010s historical drama films
2010s historical romance films
American 3D films
American historical drama films
American historical romance films
American romantic drama films
Australian 3D films
Australian historical drama films
Australian historical romance films
Australian romantic drama films
BAFTA winners (films)
Films based on The Great Gatsby
Murder–suicide in films
Films about social class
Films set in New York City
Films set in psychiatric hospitals
Films set in 1922
Films set in 1929
Films shot in Sydney
Films whose art director won the Best Art Direction Academy Award
Films that won the Best Costume Design Academy Award
Films directed by Baz Luhrmann
Films produced by Lucy Fisher
Films produced by Douglas Wick
Films scored by Craig Armstrong (composer)
Warner Bros. films
Films about alcoholism
Village Roadshow Pictures films
Animal Logic films
2010s English-language films
2010s American films